Three ships of the French Navy have borne the name Castiglione in  honour of the Battle of Castiglione

Ships named Castiglione 
 , a gunboat
 , a  74-gun ship of the line
 , a 90-gun

Notes and references

Notes

References

Bibliography 
 

French Navy ship names